Christian T. Cooke (born January 23, 1959) is an audio engineer, best known for his work in 2017 film The Shape of Water for which he was co-nominated with Brad Zoern and Glen Gauthier for Sound Mixing at 90th Academy Awards. He was born in Toronto, Ontario.
Cooke is residing in Lindsay, Ontario.

References

External links 
 

1959 births
Canadian audio engineers
Living people
Engineers from Toronto